Romand may refer to:
 Romand, the Franco-Provençal language
 Romands, the Swiss Romand people
 Romandy, the Swiss Romand region
 Románd, a village in Hungary
 Ballet Romand, a ballet company in Vevet, Switzerland

People
 Béatrice Romand (born 1952) French actress
 Françoise Romand, French filmmaker
 Jean-Claude Romand (born 1954) French criminal
 Jérémie Romand (born 1988) French ice hockey player
 Baron de Romand
 Gustave de Romand (19th century) French etymologist

See also
 Essert-Romand, a commune in France